Demetrius C. Savelio (born 28 June 1981), better known by his stage name Savage, is a New Zealand rapper and a former member of hip hop group the Deceptikonz. Savage was the first New Zealand hip hop artist to have a commercial single achieve platinum certification status in the United States. The "International Breakthrough" accolade of the Pacific Music Awards was created in his honour. Savage also has applied his recognisable voice in the electronic dance music space with 5× platinum hit ''Freaks'' with Timmy Trumpet, and 4 times platinum hit ''Swing'' with Joel Fletcher.

Early life and the Deceptikonz 
Savage grew up in Samoa and South Auckland, New Zealand, raised by his mother and siblings.

Savage joined with friends to form a hip-hop group, the Deceptikonz, in 1997. Success was not instant, however, as the group struggled through several talent shows and small concerts. Their big break came in 1999 when they were signed to South Auckland (Papatoetoe) hip hop label Dawn Raid Entertainment.

In 2002, the Deceptikonz released Elimination; a studio album that peaked at number four on the New Zealand albums chart. In late 2003, Savage featured as a member of the Deceptikonz on the Mareko hit single Stop, Drop and Roll; a number six hit on the New Zealand singles chart.

Solo career

Moonshine era (2005–2007) 
Savage's first solo single; Swing, was released in January 2005. The hit would eventually crack the Australian singles chart in 2014 and peak at number one for five weeks in the New Zealand singles chart. Three months later, Savage released his debut solo album Moonshine which reached number two in the New Zealand album chart and included a title track as a follow-up single. This became an even bigger success than the previous single; spending seven weeks at number one on the New Zealand singles chart, and reaching the top ten in the Australian singles chart. The Moonshine single would eventually become certified twice platinum in New Zealand and gold in Australia. The third single from the album; They Don't Know reached number three in the New Zealand singles chart and was also a hit for several weeks on the Australian singles chart. In 2007, Swing featured in a club scene for the United States film Knocked Up and was also included on the movie soundtrack album.

Savage Island era (2008–2009) 
Following the success of appearing in "Knocked Up", Swing was released as a single for the United States in 2008, and remix versions were made with American rappers Soulja Boy Tell 'Em and Pitbull. Upon re-release, Swing reached number forty-five on the US Billboard Hot 100, re-entered the New Zealand singles charts peaking at number twenty-three. By the end of January 2009, the song had sold over 1.5 million units in the United States alone. Because of this; Swing was certified as a platinum single in the United States.

In February 2009, Savage released Savage Island, the second studio album of his solo career. The release became his second consecutive top-ten entry on the New Zealand album chart debuting at number nine. The album included Moonshine from the previous album as well as a remix version of the New Zealand number-one hit Not Many. The release also featured two new singles Wild Out (Chooo Hooo) and Hot Like Fire. These songs became New Zealand singles chart hits with the former becoming Savage's fourth top-ten peaking song in the national chart. Savage appeared in an issue of Source Magazine to discuss the lyrical meanings behind the tracks of Savage Island the following month. In October, Savage performed the Savage Island album track I Love The Islands, to raise funds for the Samoan tsunami relief effort. In December, the video for Wild Out (Chooo Hooo) was named as one of the five most-watched YouTube music videos in New Zealand.

Battle of the Century era (2010–2012) 
In 2010, Savage featured in "Battle of the Century", a nationwide tour across New Zealand alongside internationally successful New Zealand rapper Scribe. The same year, the Presents... The Tribal Council album was released. In 2012, Savage featured on the Jade Louise single "Vibrations" which was the theme song for the television series The GC.

Collaboration era (2013–present) 
In 2013, "Swing" was remixed by Australian producer Joel Fletcher. The song peaked at number 2 on the ARIA Singles Chart and has been certified quadruple platinum by the Australian Recording Industry Association (ARIA) for shipments exceeding 280,000 copies. In 2014, Savage added vocals to Timmy Trumpet's song "Freaks". The song peaked at number one in New Zealand and was certified 2× Platinum by Recorded Music NZ. In Australia, it peaked at number 3 and was certified 5× Platinum by ARIA. It also reached the top five in Finland and won "Highest Selling Single" at the 2015 New Zealand Music Awards.

In 2015, Savage teamed up with Kronic and Far East Movement on "Push". The track was featured in the trailer for Fast and the Furious' eighth installment "The Fate of the Furious". This trailer was premiered during Super Bowl LI.

In 2016, Savage released "Zooby Doo" with Tigermonkey. The official video was overseen by world-famous choreographer Parris Goebel who runs the Palace Dance Studio in Savage's hometown of Auckland. The dancers, The Ladies of ReQuest, Mini ReQuest & Ezra from The Palace Dance Studio, New Zealand, were featured in Justin Bieber's mega YouTube hit "Sorry".

Discography

Studio albums

Compilation albums

Singles

As featured artist

Other appearances

Music videos

Notes

Awards and nominations

APRA Awards
The APRA Awards are presented annually from 1982 by the Australasian Performing Right Association (APRA), "honouring composers and songwriters".

! 
|-
| 2015 || "Swing (Joel Fletcher Remix)" || Dance Work of the Year ||  || 
|-
| 2015 || "Swing (Joel Fletcher Remix)" || Most Australian Played Work of the Year ||  || 
|-

Pacific Music Awards

New Zealand Music Awards 

MTV Europe Music Awards

References

External links 
Savage's Myspace
Dawn Raid – Savage's Official Record Label Website
RIANZ Chart

1981 births
Living people
APRA Award winners
MTV Europe Music Award winners
Dawn Raid Entertainment
New Zealand people of Samoan descent
New Zealand rappers
People from Auckland
Pacific Music Award-winning artists
21st-century New Zealand musicians